James Charles Lyle (July 24, 1900 – October 10, 1977) was a professional baseball player.  He was a right-handed pitcher for one season (1925) with the Washington Senators.  For his career, he did not record a decision and compiled a 6.00 earned run average with 3 strikeouts in 3 innings pitched.

An alumnus of Mississippi State University, he was born in Lake, Mississippi and died in Williamsport, Pennsylvania at the age of 76.

External links

1900 births
1977 deaths
Washington Senators (1901–1960) players
Major League Baseball pitchers
Baseball players from Mississippi
Ardmore Snappers players
Greenville Spinners players
Okmulgee Drillers players
Augusta Tygers players
Williamsport Grays players
Birmingham Barons players
Charlotte Hornets (baseball) players
Jacksonville Tars players
Mississippi State Bulldogs baseball players
People from Lake, Mississippi